The Great Hunger is a 1962 book about the Great Famine in Ireland in 1845–1849 by British historian Cecil Woodham-Smith. It was published by Harper and Row and Penguin Books.

The British broadcaster and journalist Robert Kee described it as, "A masterpiece of the historian's art."  Historian Denis Brogan said that it was "A moving and terrible book. It combines great literary power with great learning. It explains much in modern Ireland – and in modern America."

Notes

External links
 Review of The Great Hunger: Ireland 1845–1849 on Celtic website Transceltic.com

1962 non-fiction books
20th-century history books
Hamish Hamilton books
History books about famine
History books about Ireland
Irish non-fiction books
Works about the Great Famine (Ireland)